Darlene Michele Soltys (born August 13, 1965) is an associate judge of the Superior Court of the District of Columbia.

Education and career 
Soltys earned her Bachelor of Arts from University of Maryland, in 1987, and Juris Doctor from Georgetown University Law Center, in 1990.

After graduating law school, Soltys served as a law clerk for Judge Gregory E. Mize of the Superior Court of the District of Columbia. In 1992, she served as assistant corporation counsel for the District of Columbia until 1996 when she became an assistant state's attorney in Prince George's County, Maryland. In 2003, she went on to in the U.S. Attorney's Office in the District of Columbia as assistant United States attorney.

D.C. superior court 
On July 9, 2015, President Barack Obama nominated Soltys to a 15-year term as an associate judge of the Superior Court of the District of Columbia to the seat vacated by Judge Natalia Combs Greene. On December 3, 2015, the Senate Committee on Homeland Security and Governmental Affairs held a hearing on her nomination. On December 17, 2016, the Committee reported his nomination favorably to the Senate floor and later that day, the Senate confirmed her nomination by voice vote. She was sworn in on March 18, 2016.

References

1965 births
Living people
20th-century American women lawyers
20th-century American lawyers
21st-century American judges
21st-century American women judges
Assistant United States Attorneys
Georgetown University Law Center alumni
Judges of the Superior Court of the District of Columbia
People from Bellingham, Washington
University System of Maryland alumni